John Forrester Andrew (November 26, 1850 – May 30, 1895) was a United States representative from Massachusetts. He was born to John Albion Andrew and Eliza Jane (Hersey) Andrew in Hingham on November 26, 1850. He attended private schools, including Phillips School and Brooks School. He graduated from Harvard University in 1872 and from Harvard Law School in 1875. He was admitted to the Suffolk bar and commenced practice in Boston.

He was a member of the Massachusetts House of Representatives. and served in the Massachusetts State Senate.  He also served as Boston commissioner of parks. He was an unsuccessful Democratic candidate for Governor in 1886.

Andrew was elected as a Democrat to the Fifty-first and Fifty-second Congresses (March 4, 1889 – March 3, 1893). He served as chairman of the U.S. House Committee on Reform in the Civil Service (Fifty-second Congress).  He was an unsuccessful candidate for reelection in 1892 to the Fifty-third Congress. Andrew resumed the practice of his profession, and died in Boston on May 30, 1895.  His interment was in Mount Auburn Cemetery in Cambridge.

Notes

 

1850 births
1895 deaths
People from Hingham, Massachusetts
American people of English descent
Democratic Party members of the United States House of Representatives from Massachusetts
Democratic Party members of the Massachusetts House of Representatives
Democratic Party Massachusetts state senators
19th-century American politicians
Brooks School alumni
Phillips Academy alumni
Harvard Law School alumni
Burials at Mount Auburn Cemetery
Harvard College alumni